Baixador de Vallvidrera is a railway station in the Sarrià-Sant Gervasi district of Barcelona. It is served by lines S1 and S2 of the Metro del Vallès commuter rail system, which are operated by Ferrocarrils de la Generalitat de Catalunya, who also run the station.

The station has twin tracks and two side platforms. Access to the street is via stairs and lifts.

The station opened in 1916, with the opening of the Collserola tunnel and the line from Peu del Funicular station to the Vallès.

The GR 92 long-distance footpath, which roughly follows the length of the Mediterranean coast of Spain, has a staging point at the station. The railway provides good access to both stages from the centre of the city of Barcelona.

See also
List of railway stations in Barcelona

References

External links
 
 Information and photos about the station at Trenscat.com

Stations on the Barcelona–Vallès Line
Railway stations in Spain opened in 1916
Transport in Sarrià-Sant Gervasi